A yad (literally "hand";  hant, "hand") is a Jewish ritual pointer, popularly known as a Torah pointer, used by the reader to follow the text during the Torah reading from the parchment Torah scrolls. It is often shaped like a long rod, capped by a small hand with its index finger pointing from it.

Rationale

Beyond its practical usage in pointing out letters, the yad ensures that the parchment is not touched during the reading. There are several reasons for this: handling the parchment renders one ritually impure and the often-fragile parchment is easily damaged. Moreover, the vellum parchment does not absorb ink so touching the scroll with fingers will damage the lettering.

Manufacture
A yad can be made of any number of materials, though silver is common, especially used in crowning the yad. In some cases, a yad is covered with fabric.

Mountain Jews

The Mountain Jews had a peculiar way with pointers: they were held in pairs forming a V-shape dividing the text into passages. They were made and donated in pairs, even joined together with a chain when they had inscriptions related to the same event. Their shapes were of two types: a flat bar and a bar twisted into a long  tight screw-like shape with a flat part. In both types, the pointing part is made in the shape of a flat broad leaf with a rounded tip. 

From the inscriptions on the pointers, one may deduce a specific ritual of Mountain Jews: before reading, the Torah is displayed to the congregation and the pointer indicated to it as a conceptual parallel to the guiding hand of God.

There are a number of different names for the pointer used by the Mountain Jews, indicating the variety of traditions. Most common ones are etzba ("finger") and kulmus.

See also
 Ktav Stam

References

Torah reading
Jewish ritual objects